Lakeview Guest House is an official residence of the Telangana Government. It was built in 2005. It was official residence of Andhra Pradesh Chief minister till 2009. It is located on Raj Bhavan Road.

References

Official residences in India
Heritage structures in Hyderabad, India
Government buildings in Telangana